Practically Yours is a 1944 comedic film made by Paramount Pictures, directed by Mitchell Leisen, written by Norman Krasna and starring Claudette Colbert and Fred MacMurray.

Plot
When a young pilot, Daniel Bellamy, is presumed dead after crash-bombing an enemy aircraft carrier, the footage of the crash and his presumably final reminiscence of walking in the park with 'Piggy' and kissing her on the nose is sent back home. A typographical error in transcribing his words becomes a tribute to heroism, while a girl who worked in his office, Peggy, is thought to be the object of his secret love. However, Dan returns home and in order to save embarrassment for both the girl and himself, he tries to maintain the pretense. Dan reveals that he was not speaking of a girl but of his dog. A series of comical mishaps ensue, leading to a resolution of the misunderstanding.

Cast
Claudette Colbert as  Peggy Martin
Fred MacMurray as  Daniel Bellamy
Gil Lamb as  Albert W. Beagell
Cecil Kellaway as  Marvin P. Meglin
Robert Benchley as  Judge Robert Simpson
Tom Powers as  Commander Harry Harpe
Jane Frazee as  Musical comedy star
Rosemary DeCamp as  Ellen Macy
Isabel Randolph as  Mrs. Meglin
Mikhail Rasumny as  LaCrosse
Kitty Kelly as wife (uncredited)

Production
The film was based on an original story by Norman Krasna. He had written a film called Bachelor Party that was produced by Buddy DeSylva, who had since become head of production at Paramount. In September 1943, Paramount bought Practically Yours from Krasna. He had written the story in his spare time while on duty for the armed services in Los Angeles.

In December 1943, Paramount announced the stars as Fred MacMurray and Paulette Goddard with George Marshall as director and Harry Tugend as producer. In January 1944, Goddard left for an army camp tour and her role was taken by Claudette Colbert. Mitchell Leisen replaced Marshall as director. Filming started in January 1944.

Reception
The Los Angeles Times said the film "maybe ... isn't quite big time, but it has the look."

In a contemporary review for The New York Times, critic Bosley Crowther called the film "a curiously thick-skinned little comedy" but with "the ugly contours of a most callous and inhuman jest." Crowther was uneasy with the film's premise given the state of the warring world at the time, writing: "[T]he crocodile-tearful provocation which Norman Krasna used for the yarn is decidedly tasteless and unworthy. This is no time to joke about grief."

Radio adaptation
Practically Yours was presented on Broadway Playhouse December 3, 1952. The 30-minute adaptation starred Gloria DeHaven.

References

External links

1944 films
American black-and-white films
Films scored by Victor Young
Films directed by Mitchell Leisen
Paramount Pictures films
1944 romantic comedy films
American romantic comedy films
1940s American films